

George Hollingsworth (1813–1882) was an American artist, teacher, and administrator active in Massachusetts.

His father, Mark Hollingsworth, was part owner of Tileston & Hollingsworth, a paper manufacturing firm. George completed his studies in Europe. For 28 years he managed and taught at the Lowell Institute, which began admitting women students at his suggestion.  He was affiliated with the Boston Artists' Association.

He lived in Milton, and kept a studio in Boston on Washington Street (c. 1848–1868). His paintings Portrait of the Hollingsworth Family (c. 1840) and The Hollingsworth Home in Milton (1840s) are in the Museum of Fine Arts, Boston.

References

Further reading

 Albert Kendall Teele. "George Hollingsworth." The history of Milton, Mass., 1640-1887. Press of Rockwell and Churchill, 1887.
 Samuel L. Gerry. Old Masters of Boston. New England Magazine, v.3, no.6, Feb. 1891.
 Barbara N. Parker. George Hollingsworth and His Family. Bulletin of the Museum of Fine Arts, Vol. 50, No. 280 (Jun., 1952), pp. 30–31.

1813 births
1882 deaths
19th century in Boston
American artists
People from Milton, Massachusetts